Velculescu is a Romanian surname. Notable people with the surname include:

Delia Velculescu (born 1975), Romanian economist
Victor Velculescu (born 1970), Romanian oncologist

Romanian-language surnames